Gulli is a French television network. Gulli may also refer to
Gulli, Republic of Dagestan, a rural locality in Dagestan, Russia
Gulli.com, an internet portal for Germany and German-speaking regions 
Gulli Petrini (1867–1941), Swedish physicist, writer, suffragette and politician
Jessica Gulli (born 1988), Australian sprinter